Nothing's All Bad is a 2010 Danish drama film directed by Mikkel Munch-Fals.

Cast 
 Bodil Jørgensen as Ingeborg
 Henrik Prip as Anders
  as Jonas
  as Anna
  as Jonas' ex bofælle
 Jesper Asholt as Bingoværten
  as Anders' direktør
 Rasmus Bjerg as Pornoshopindehaver
 Carsten Bjørnlund as Kunde hos prostitueret
  as Tove
 Nicolas Bro as Læge på kræftafdeling
  as Ingeborgs direktør
 Christina Chanée as Thaikvinde 
 Stine Fischer Christensen as Prostitueret

References

External links 

2010 drama films
2010 films
Danish drama films
2010s Danish-language films